Gabrielle Palmer has been involved in international efforts to stop the unethical promotion of breastmilk substitutes globally and to support appropriate infant feeding for over 40 years. She is the author of the seminal text, The Politics of Breastfeeding, now in its revised third edition and which has never been out of print.

Childhood and family life
Born in St Thomas's Hospital, Palmer spent her childhood in South London. She attended the Convent of Our Lady of Sion, Bayswater, London 1958 to 1965 and then studied at Manchester University (BA General Arts, 1966 to 1969) where she met John. They married in 1968 and in the early 1970s she became a National Childbirth Trust breastfeeding counsellor.

Early professional life
Palmer's professional life began as a secondary school teacher (1969 to 1976) and then she worked as a Save the Children, Schools and Universities Organiser 1977 to 1980. The family moved to Mozambique in 1981 where Palmer volunteered (with International Voluntary Service) working in nutrition and education within various government institutions in Maputo including in an orphanage and hospitals. She ran classes for mothers of malnourished children to support complementary feeding classes using locally available foods and taught nutrition to student health workers. She observed that mothers can sustain breastfeeding, despite poor food intake, if the breastfeeding culture is not undermined by false information, whether commercial or medical.  
Palmer returned to the UK to study for an MSc Human Nutrition at the London School of Hygiene and Tropical Medicine (1985) and is recognised as an authority on supporting breastfeeding and campaigner to stop unethical promotion of breastmilk substitutes.

The making of a campaigner
In 1974, when her two children were still small, Palmer read The Baby Killer, a booklet by Mike Muller published by the charity  War on Want
highlighting the aggressive promotion of breastmilk substitutes in regions where their use led to infection and death of infants.  Palmer resolved to work against the unethical promotion of artificial milks over breastfeeding. She was instrumental in establishing the campaigning group Baby Milk Action (International Baby Food Action Network, IBFAN) based in Cambridge, UK and of which she is still a patron. This work with Baby Milk Action included coordinating the UK boycott of Nestle products, raising awareness of the issue and of the WHO/UNICEF International Code of Marketing of Breast-milk Substitutes in UK colleges, schools and institutions as well as engaging the attention of politicians and public figures. 

She also served as a managing trustee for Health Books International in the days it was known as Teaching-aids at Low Cost, TALC.

Lecturing and teaching 
She remained busy with campaigning, designing training courses, teaching, consultancies and writing. From 1991–97 Palmer was co-director of the international short course, Breastfeeding: practice and policy at the Institute of Child Health, London. During these years she contributed to the development of the WHO/UNICEF transferable courses designed for the ‘cascade’ training of trainers, globally.  These included, Breastfeeding Counselling: a training Course, field testing the Chinese version in Taiwan in 1997; the UNICEF training course on the International Code of Marketing of Breast-milk Substitutes and the WHO/UNICEF HIV and Infant Feeding course.  
In 1999 she was appointed HIV and Infant Feeding Officer in UNICEF HQ, New York. From 2001 to 2007 she worked as a part-time lecturer and tutor at the London School of Hygiene and Tropical Medicine as well as simultaneously serving on UNICEF UK Baby Friendly Initiative Designation Committee, and continuing various freelance consultancy work. 
She has worked and run short training courses for health professionals in 46 countries including Mongolia, Libya and North Korea.

Books

In 1988 Pandora Press (Unwin Hyman) published Palmer’s first book, The Politics of Breastfeeding. It proved influential and became required reading on courses for midwives and others. It underwent a minor update when it was subsequently republished by Harper Collins in 1993 and a major revision for the Pinter & Martin edition which launched in 2009 and was reprinted in the same year as well as in 2011 and 2016. This new edition contains a new chapter Your Generous Donations Could do More Harm Than Good which is being used by the Professor of Nutrition at Columbia University to educate her students on nutrition in emergencies. Palmer's key scholarly contributions and books are:

References

Living people
1947 births
People from London
Alumni of the University of Manchester
Alumni of the University of London
English non-fiction writers
Breastfeeding activists
Feminism and health
Parent education program
British women writers
20th-century British writers
21st-century British writers
British health activists